Radan Milenov Kanev (born 30 September 1975) is a Bulgarian politician who was elected as a Member of the European Parliament from Bulgaria in the 2019 European Parliament election. He used to be one of the leading members of the Reformist Bloc.

Biography 

Kanev was born in Sofia, but his family's roots are from Varna. He graduated from the Lycée Français de Sofia, subsequently completing his legal studies at Sofia University.

In the 1990s, Kanev was chairman of the youth organization of the Bulgarian Red Cross. Kanev is known as a prominent political blogger and his active involvement in politics began in 2004.

He joined DSB in 2007 and became the party's leader on 23 June 2013. Kanev has been labeled as Ivan Kostov's successor. After DSB could not make the 4% bar for entry into Parliament during the 2017 elections, Kanev resigned as a leader of the party.

Radan Kanev supported Boyko Borisov's second government: DSB was an official coalition partner. Subsequently, Kanev built a reputation as a strong critic of Bulgaria's Prime Minister Boyko Borisov. He has underlined that in Bulgaria there are major problems with the justice system and the respect for private property. He blames the issues on the Borisov-Peevski model of governance, which has "dominated Bulgarian politics in the past ten years."

In 2019, Kanev was elected as Member of the European Parliament from the Democratic Bulgaria coalition. He intends to join the European People's Party. Kanev argues that "governing the European Union without the European People's Party is impossible" and advocates that the European Greens should be part of the governing majority in the current European Parliament.

In 2022, after the fall of Kiril Petkov's government, Kanev called for unity regarding Bulgaria's foreign policy despite political differences.

Personal life 
Kanev is married and has one child.

References

External links

1975 births
Living people
Politicians from Sofia
21st-century Bulgarian lawyers
Bulgarian conservatives
Sofia University alumni
MEPs for Bulgaria 2019–2024